Absalom Willis "Rock" Norman (September 15, 1892 – June 20, 1981) was an American college basketball and track coach. Norman spent 51 years coaching at the college and high school level, with basketball head coaching stints at several colleges in the state of South Carolina: Furman, South Carolina, The Citadel and Clemson.

He also served as an assistant football coach at Clemson, as well as head track coach for the Tigers, where he is the namesake of the Rock Norman Track and Field Complex.

Norman died at Anderson Memorial Hospital in Anderson, South Carolina on June 20, 1981 at age 88.

References

External links
Coaching record @ sports-reference.com
Roanoke College Athletics Hall of Fame profile

1892 births
1981 deaths
American men's basketball coaches
American track and field coaches
Basketball coaches from Virginia
Basketball players from Virginia
The Citadel Bulldogs basketball coaches
Clemson Tigers football coaches
Clemson Tigers men's basketball coaches
Clemson Tigers track and field coaches
College men's basketball head coaches in the United States
Furman Paladins football coaches
Furman Paladins men's basketball coaches
People from Culpeper County, Virginia
Roanoke Maroons baseball players
Roanoke Maroons football players
Roanoke Maroons men's basketball players